Buxerolles may refer to the following places in France:

Buxerolles, Côte-d'Or, a commune in the department of Côte-d'Or
Buxerolles, Vienne, a commune in the department of Vienne